The 1908 Massachusetts gubernatorial election was held on November 4, 1908.

Democratic nomination

Governor

Candidates
 James H. Vahey, State Senator from Watertown

Withdrew
 E. Gerry Brown, labor leader

Results
Vahey was unopposed for the Democratic nomination.

General election

Results

Governor

Lt. Governor

See also
 1908 Massachusetts legislature
 1908 Massachusetts Senate election

References

Governor
1908
Massachusetts
November 1908 events